The NABC Player of the Year is an award given annually by the National Association of Basketball Coaches (NABC) to recognize the top player in men's college basketball. The award has been given since the 1974–75 season to National Collegiate Athletic Association (NCAA) Division I basketball players. The association added awards for Division II and Division III players in 1983, and for National Association of Intercollegiate Athletics (NAIA) and junior college players in 2008. The awards have previously been sponsored by State Farm Insurance.

In Division I, Duke has the most all-time awards with six and the most separate recipients with five. Their rival, North Carolina, as well as Kansas are tied for second in both awards and individual recipients, with four each. There have been three ties for NABC Player of the Year (2002, 2004, 2006), and only two players have won the award multiple times (Jason Williams and Ralph Sampson, with only Sampson having been the sole winner of two awards).

In Division II, Virginia Union leads for most awards with four and individual recipients with three. It is followed by Florida Southern, Kentucky Wesleyan, Metro State, Northwest Missouri State, and Winona State with three awards each. Among these schools, Northwest Missouri and Winona State each have one two-time recipient. Only one tie has occurred (2006), while four players have won the award more than once (Stan Gouard, Earl Jones, John Smith, and Trevor Hudgins).

In Division III, three programs are tied for the most awards—Amherst, Cabrini, and Potsdam State. Each has had one two-time recipient. Four other programs have had two recipients—Calvin, Guilford, Otterbein, and Wittenberg. There have been two ties (2007, 2010) and four repeat winners (Leroy Witherspoon, Andrew Olson, Aaron Walton-Moss and Joey Flannery).

At the NAIA level, the NABC presented a single award in the 2007–08 season, even though the NAIA had held separate Division I and Division II national championships since 1992. The following season, the NABC began presenting separate awards in Divisions I and II, and continued to do so through the 2019–20 season. After that season, the NAIA eliminated its basketball divisions, returning to a single championship for all members, and the NABC accordingly returned to a presenting a single NAIA award. During the divisional era, Division I member Georgetown (KY) received the most awards and had the most individual recipients, with three each. The only player to have won more than one Division I award is Dominique Rambo of SAGU, who shared the 2013 award and was sole recipient in 2014. The only other school with more than one D-I recipient is Oklahoma Baptist with two. The only player with more than one Division II award is Dominez Burnett, who received two awards with Davenport. Two other programs, Northwood (FL) (now Keiser) and Oklahoma Wesleyan, had two D-II recipients. One other player received the award in both the divisional and non-divisional eras: Kyle Mangas of Indiana Wesleyan received the final Division II award in 2020 and the single award in 2021. 

In junior college, every winner has been a sophomore and had gone on to play at an NCAA Division I school after their community college careers ended until 2020. Jay Scrubb, that year's winner, hired an agent and declared for the 2020 NBA draft, thereby forgoing his remaining collegiate eligibility. He had committed to Louisville prior to renouncing that decision to enter the NBA draft pool.

Key

Division I Player of the Year

Division II Player of the Year

Division III Player of the Year

NAIA Players of the Year
In 2008–09, the NABC began presenting separate awards for players of the year in NAIA Divisions I and II. In 2020–21, the NAIA removed its divisional classifications.

Divisional era (2008–2020)

Non-divisional era (2007–08; 2020–present)

Junior College Player of the Year
Since community college players only attend for two years, these players are only either freshmen or sophomores. Afterwards, they move on to a four-year university to finish their last two seasons of NCAA eligibility. The University column reflects which team these players would play for following their junior college careers.

See also
List of U.S. men's college basketball national player of the year awards

Footnotes

References

External links
 

Awards established in 1975
College basketball player of the year awards in the United States
National Association of Basketball Coaches